Outpost is a studio album by jazz musician Freddie Hubbard released in 1981 on the Enja label which features performances by Hubbard, Kenny Barron, Buster Williams and Al Foster.

Track listing
 "Santa Anna Winds" - 9:36
 "You Don't Know What Love Is" (DePaul, Raye) - 6:31
 "The Outpost Blues" - 4:18
 "Dual Force" (Williams) - 7:10
 "Loss" (Dolphy) - 10:02
All compositions by Freddie Hubbard except as indicated
 Recorded on March 16 & 17, 1981

Personnel
 Freddie Hubbard: trumpet
 Kenny Barron: piano
 Buster Williams: bass
 Al Foster: drums

References

1981 albums
Freddie Hubbard albums
Enja Records albums